The Cinderella Stakes is an American Thoroughbred horse race run annually at Hollywood Park Racetrack in Inglewood, California. It is open to two-year-old fillies and is contested on Cushion Track synthetic dirt over a distance of five and one half furlongs. The Listed race currently offers a purse of $70,000 added.

Inaugurated in the fall of 1950 as a race for three-year-old fillies and set at a distance of a mile and one-sixteenth, the first winner was Alfred G. Vanderbilt's filly Next Move who went on to earn that year's American Champion Three-Year-Old Filly honors.

Past winners

 2012 - Miss Empire (Kevin Krigger)
 2011 - Killer Graces (Joseph Talamo)
 2010 - Shell Air
 2009 - Well Deserved
 2008 - Trifecta King
 2007 - Wonderful Luck
 2006 - Richwoman
 2005 - River's Prayer
 2004 - Souvenir Gift
 2003 - Yogis Polar Bear
 2002 - Magic Smoke
 2001 - Georgias Storm
 2000 - Golden Ballet
 1999 - Magicalmysterycat
 1998 - Western Woman
 1997 - Bent Creek City
 1996 - Starry Ice
 1982 - Barzell
 1981 - Orphans Art
 1980 - Sweet Amends
 1979 - Table Hands

References
 The 2008 Cinderella Stakes at Bloodhorse.com
 Cinderella Stakes at Hollywood Park

Horse races in California
Hollywood Park Racetrack
Flat horse races for two-year-old fillies
Listed stakes races in the United States
Recurring sporting events established in 1950
1950 establishments in California